KZZG-LP (106.9 FM) is a low-power FM radio station licensed to Hugo, Oklahoma, United States. The station is currently owned by Goodland Academy

History
The callsign was KZZG-LP on December 8, 2016.

References

External links

ZZG-LP
ZZG-LP